Stephanie Zvan is an American skeptic, feminist activist and radio host, blogger, newspaper writer, and fiction author. Her radio show, Atheists Talk, is produced by Minnesota Atheists and broadcast on KTNF in Minnesota.

Her fiction has been published in Nature and Scientific American.

Kathleen Raven has noted her as an important science/rational/skeptic blogger.

She voiced opposition to harassment of women in the Rebecca Watson elevator incident and following a 2012 Readercon F/SF convention incident, and is involved in research on "collaborative social blocking" of Internet trolls to provide a more inviting social space for women and other minorities.

Bibliography

"Here be monsters", Nature
"The Gravity of the Situation", Scientific American

References

External links

Writers from Minnesota
American science fiction writers
American women short story writers
American short story writers
Living people
American skeptics
American atheism activists
American newspaper journalists
American feminist writers
Year of birth missing (living people)
Women science fiction and fantasy writers
American women non-fiction writers
21st-century American women